Train surfing (also known as train hopping or train hitching) is the act of riding on the outside of a moving train, tram or another rail transport. In a number of countries, the term train hopping is used synonymously with freight hopping, which means riding on the outside of a freight train, while train surfing can be practiced on any type of train. This type of travelling can be dangerous and even life-threatening, because there is a risk of death or serious injury from falling off a moving train, electrocution from power supply (overhead catenary wire, current collectors, resistors, etc.), colliding with railway infrastructure (bridges, tunnels, platforms, railway signals or other trains) while riding outside off structure gauge on the side or on the roof of a train, or unsuccessful attempts to jump on a moving train or off it. Today, the practice is forbidden by statutes on many railroads in the world. Despite this, it is still practiced, especially on those railroads where the trains are overcrowded.

History 

The phenomenon of riding on the outside of trains came with the appearance of the first railway lines. On a series of first railroads, riding on rooftops and footboards of trains was common, but over time, starting from the second half of the 19th century, with an increase in the sizes and speed of trains, passenger coaches began to be produced fully covered and insulated from streets with a placement of all passenger seats inside carriages in order to improve the safety of passengers and prevent people falling from a moving train. However, some individuals continued riding on the outside of trains to travel without having a ticket.

In the United States, this became a common means of transportation following the American Civil War as the railroads began pushing westward, especially among migrant workers who became known as "hobos". It continued to be widely used by those unable to afford other transportation, especially during times of widespread economic dislocation such as the Great Depression.

In the first half of the 20th century during the era of trams rising in Europe and USA, trams in some cities became overcrowded, so some passengers began a practice of riding on footboards, doors, couplers and sometimes on the roofs of trams. Also, train surfing often occurred in European countries during the war conflicts, especially during the First World War, Russian Civil War and World War II. Soldiers and refugees often traveled on the roofs of carriages due to lack of seats inside.

In the mid-20th century, European and American railroad companies in many countries took measures to reduce overcrowding in cars and prevent riding outside of them, so the prevalence of train surfing in those countries decreased. However, in some countries of Southeast Asia and Africa with a high population density, the problem of overcrowding of different vehicles, including trains, grew rapidly, so train surfing in those countries became a widespread phenomenon.

As an extreme hobby, train surfing firstly appeared in South Africa during the 1980s among teenagers from poor families, and then began to appear in other countries around the world. Teenagers as young as 13 were reported as train surfing in Rio de Janeiro in 1988. During the 1990s, train surfing on a commuter electric multiple unit train became popular in Europe among young people who live near railway lines.

In Germany, the practice of S-Bahn surfing was made popular during the 1990s. The phenomenon was forgotten until the millennium, but in 2005 it was rediscovered by a group of train surfers from Frankfurt, Germany. The leader of the crew who calls himself "the Trainrider" surfed the InterCityExpress, the fastest train in Germany. An Internet video claimed that he died a year later from an incurable form of leukemia, but later the Trainrider revealed in an interview that this video was made by a fan and the story of his death was a hoax.

In the Soviet Union during the 1980s teens and youths sometimes surfed trams. The practice of surfing on electric trains appeared during the 1990s in Russia and some other post-Soviet countries due to the economic crisis and growing interest among teens and youths who lived near the railroads. In around the year 2000 they also began to surf subway trains in tunnels in the Moscow Metro and organized train surfing crews and web-communities.

Beginning in the mid-2000s there were frequent cancellation of commuter trains and crowding inside rail cars in the Moscow region. In the summer of 2010 dozens of commuter trains were cancelled due to track repairs on the Moscow railway and the crowding of trains and the number of train surfers in the Moscow region rose dramatically. This was when train surfing for the first time became a wide phenomenon on Russian railways and it caused a big scandal. Train surfing was mostly a teenager hobby before this. After the railroad track repairs were completed  overcrowding on trains began to reduce and the number of ordinary passengers who were roof riding disappeared. Roof riding among teenagers became more popular and they began to create a community of train surfers and post videos on YouTube. Train surfers began to organize meetings and big-way surfing events on the outside of commuter, subway and local freight trains via the Internet. Russian train surfing fans began to call themselves "Zatseper" and also name their hobby "Zatseping" (from the Russian word "Зацепиться-Zatsepitsya" translated as "to catch on"). Train surfing became something like an extreme sport discipline for them. From the beginning of 2011, Russian train surfers made several rides on the outside of the high-speed Siemens Velaro train "Sapsan", the fastest train in Russia.

In Indonesia, especially Greater Jakarta, large numbers of people train surf, especially since the late 1990s, as gridlock grips this metropolis of 30 million without a single metro system, and the city comes up with alternative transport such as car jockeys.  Jakarta traffic is the most gridlocked in Southeast Asia, perhaps among the worst worldwide. It has built a bus rapid transit system, but with little success, as there is no separation from the heavy traffic. The tropical heat and urban heat island effect also makes the top the only place on the train with plenty of air circulation. Since 2013 the practice has been eliminated after the state railway company Kereta Api Indonesia modernized the ticketing system, allowing tickets to be sold up to 90 days in advance, and including check in requirements along with increasing number of rolling stocks. On KRL commuter services, stations are modernized by installing turnstiles, implementing contactless payment and locking down the station. All non-commuter train now have passenger limit of 100 to 110% while previously a service could run at 200% or more capacity.

Current state 

Train surfing is a common and usual way to ride trains in countries such as Bangladesh and South Africa, where this type of riding by trains is compelled due to the high population density and severe overcrowding of trains. This practice is a serious issue in these countries where people have been killed or injured in numerous accidents. However, train surfing can occur in any area with trains and trams. Individuals may train-surf to avoid the cost of a ticket or as a recreational activity.

With the creation of the internet, the practice of filming the act and posting online videos of it is on the increase worldwide. Train surfers can use social networks to find and communicate with each other and organize trips by trains in small groups. In countries where a big community of train surfers exists, they sometimes organize major events of riding on the outside of local trains, where dozens of riders participate.

Some railroad workers, such as shunters or conductors, are often allowed to ride on exterior parts of trains during shunting operations, but with many limitations.

Motivation 
Passengers who practice train surfing consider it as an extreme hobby, or to get a free ride by train, which has a number of advantages in comparison with riding inside a railcar:
 enjoyment of riding and feeling of speed;
 extended view of surrounding area in comparison with the view from a window inside a railcar;
 opportunity to avoid the cost of a ticket;
 opportunity to ride in comfort when a train is extremely crowded;
 opportunity to ride a train which simply has no room for more people, need to go to work;
 opportunity to ride in comfort when there is a strong heat inside railcars;
 opportunity to catch a departing train or jump from an arriving train at low speed before a complete stop;
 opportunity to ride on a train which does not provide transportation of passengers (for example on a freight train, service train, single locomotive, etc.).

Hazards
Hazards that occur whilst train surfing include falling from a train, falling underneath the train, colliding with objects that are close to the trains path as it moves down the railway track and electric shocks.

A person can receive an electric shock from an overhead power line when their body comes into contact with it.

A person can receive an electric shock from an electric arc without their body making contact with an overhead powerline. An electric arc can go from an overhead power line and pass through the air and then make contact with a persons body. When this electric arc reaches a persons body they can then receive an electric shock from it.

Injuries and deaths

In the ten years prior to August 2000 in Brazil there were 100 people who died in more than 200 accidents.

In South Africa in 2006 19 people died whilst train surfing with a further 100 train surfing accidents occurring.

In Indonesia in a two year period prior to 2008 53 people died whilst train surfing.

In the Russian Central Federal District in 2015 there were 24 people injured whilst train surfing and in 2016 in the Central Federal District there were 9 people who died whilst train surfing.

In New York from 1989 to 2011 there were 13 people who died and 56 people injured train surfing.

In Ukraine in 2017 there were 12 people who died whilst train surfing.

In Germany between 1989 and 1995 there were 41 train surfing accidents with 18 of these 41 accidents resulting in the person's death.

Prevention and punishments 

Train surfing is illegal on most railways in the world, with some exceptions. Many railroad companies usually take a zero tolerance policy to practice of riding on exterior parts of trains, and employ railway police and guards in an attempt to prevent the practice. Police officers and guards usually patrol the territory of large passenger stations and freight yards, and can arrest train surfers if they are spotted. In some countries, railway police can patrol the territory of railways in utility trucks, SUVs ("bullmobiles"), or even standard police cars. In countries where the practice of trains surfing occurs regularly, the police frequently organize raids in order to detect and remove surfers off the trains and arrest them. The most common form of penalty for train surfers is a fine, however, in some countries, such as the United States or Canada, train surfers can be not only fined, but imprisoned too.

In the United Kingdom, train surfing is prohibited under railway byelaw No. 10, which prohibits travelling in or on any train except in areas of the train intended for use by that person.

At least 87 people were arrested in the last four months of 2010 in Melbourne for offences relating to train surfing. In Russia, over 1000 train surfers were arrested at the Moscow Railway during ten months of 2011. In India, 153 people were prosecuted in a single day in June 2012 for train surfing on the Central Railway.

Deterrents 

To reduce the practice of riding on the outside of trains, railway companies often place signs that warn about the dangers of train surfing.  While there are no official numbers, the London Underground ran a public awareness campaign against "tube surfing".

The Indonesian railway company, PT Kereta Api, has tried several methods to deter train surfers. Early methods included hosing those caught with red paint and placing barbed wire on train roofs. In 2012 the company began suspending concrete balls above the railway, a short distance from the stations. This method was criticised as being potentially lethal.

See also 

 Car surfing
 Elevator surfing
 Freight Train Riders of America
 List of graffiti and street art injuries and deaths
 List of train surfing injuries and deaths
 Railfan
 Surfing Soweto, a 2010 South African documentary about train surfing.

References

Notes

Bibliography

External links 

 Staff Riding: 1°place Short Feature category 2014 World Press Photo Muldimedia Contest winner on the train surfing phenomenon in South Africa
 Train Surfing: Assessment of Risk Jinx Magazine
 Station 2: Trainsurfing article TV2 (resume and screenshots from TV-doc, Danish language)
 Danish news article about the first official train surfing accident in Denmark
 Indonesia concrete balls combat "train surfing"

Surfing
Types of travel
Outdoor recreation
Articles containing video clips
1980s fads and trends
1990s fads and trends